S.W.O.R.D. (Sentient World Observation and Response Department) is a fictional counterterrorism and intelligence agency appearing in American comic books published by Marvel Comics. Its purpose is to deal with extraterrestrial threats to world security and is the space-based counterpart of S.H.I.E.L.D., which deals with local threats to the world.

The organization appears in several forms of media, such as The Avengers: Earth's Mightiest Heroes and the Marvel Cinematic Universe (MCU) miniseries WandaVision on Disney+.

Publication history
S.W.O.R.D. was first introduced in Astonishing X-Men vol. 3 #6 and was created by Joss Whedon and John Cassaday.

Fictional organization biography
In the comics, S.W.O.R.D. was originally an offshoot of S.H.I.E.L.D., but since the departure of Nick Fury as director of S.H.I.E.L.D., relations between the two organizations have become strained. The head of S.W.O.R.D. is Special Agent Abigail Brand. Its primary command-and-control headquarters are aboard the orbital space station known as the Peak.

S.W.O.R.D. had an undercover operative in the X-Mansion. In Astonishing X-Men vol. 3, #17, the identity of this undercover operative was revealed to be Lockheed.

In "Unstoppable"
The Astonishing X-Men, as well as Hisako Ichiki, Ord of the Breakworld, and Danger, are taken to deep space by S.W.O.R.D. and Agent Abigail Brand. S.W.O.R.D. psychics fail to detect Cassandra Nova in Emma Frost's shattered psyche. Though emotionally wounded, Emma recovered fast enough to be present for the team's departure to the Breakworld, where they planned to disable a missile aimed at Earth. Before they reached Breakworld, they were attacked by enemy vessels. After creating a diversion, the X-Men and Agent Brand landed on the planet, where Agent Deems was being tortured in prison.

Brand, Cyclops, Emma Frost, and Beast landed together, while Wolverine, Hisako, Colossus, and Kitty Pryde landed elsewhere. Wolverine's spacecraft disintegrated in mid-air and they were forced to abandon ship. Kitty and Colossus phased through the pod to the planet's surface, where they landed unharmed. Hisako and Wolverine landed with the impact burning Wolverine's skin.

Another team composed of Lockheed, Sydren, and S.W.O.R.D. troops converged upon a place called "the Palace of the Corpse".

Near the end Agent Brand informs Kitty that Lockheed is working for S.W.O.R.D. as their undercover agent.

In "Secret Invasion"
During the 2008 "Secret Invasion" storyline, S.W.O.R.D.'s headquarters called the Peak is destroyed by a Skrull infiltrator posing as S.H.I.E.L.D.'s Dum Dum Dugan. Many agents die in the initial explosion, though others survive due to hostile-environment suits. Brand, encased in one of the suits, manages to make her way into one of the Skrull ships.

In "Dark Reign"
During the 2008 - 2009 "Dark Reign" storyline, S.H.I.E.L.D. is reformed as H.A.M.M.E.R. under Norman Osborn. S.W.O.R.D.'s position under H.A.M.M.E.R. has not yet been revealed. In the Beta Ray Bill: Godhunter mini-series, Beta Ray Bill visits Agent Brand aboard the rebuilt Peak in order to obtain information about the whereabouts of Galactus.

S.W.O.R.D. volume 1
During the 2009 Chicago Comic Con, it was announced that Kieron Gillen will collaborate with Steven Sanders on a S.W.O.R.D. ongoing series that began in November 2009. The new series starts with Henry Peter Gyrich being assigned as S.W.O.R.D. co-commander alongside Abigail Brand.

In the first arc, Gyrich is able to persuade the heads of S.W.O.R.D. to pass legislation to have all aliens currently living on Earth deported from the planet while Brand was distracted with another mission. He manages to take several notable aliens into custody including Noh-Varr, Adam X, Beta Ray Bill, Jazinda, Karolina Dean, and Hepzibah.

The series was cancelled with issue #5. The first issue started with estimated direct sales of 21,988, but that had dropped to 15,113 by the second issue.

The Peak is later evacuated after it is damaged by the Apocalypse Twins. The debris from the station nearly destroys Rio de Janeiro, but is safely vaporized by Sunfire.

The organization is shown as working smoothly and functioning when it sends a capture team to take custody of alien refugees and a paramedic assistance team to the Jean Grey School. Unfortunately, both teams are murdered by the same Brood-based threat.

The rebuilt station is overtaken by alien symbiotes and Brood warriors. The station's personnel are taken for hosts.

S.W.O.R.D. volume 2

S.W.O.R.D. was relaunched in December 2020 as part of "Reign of X". Written by Al Ewing and drawn by Valerio Schiti, the initial team consisted of Abigail Brand, Cable, Frenzy, Fabian Cortez, Magneto, Manifold and Wiz Kid.

S.W.O.R.D. (Sentient World Observation and Response Directorate) was restored when Abigail Brand resigned from Alpha Flight after the Alliance-Cotati conflict feeling that the space program wasn't properly utilized and when the mutant nation repowered the abandoned Peak space station. In cooperation with the Quiet Council of Krakoa, it became the mutant nation's representative to the outer universe.

With Abigail Brand as the Station Commander, S.W.O.R.D functions with a six-tier organizational structure:

 Technology/Engineering
 Station Technologist – Wiz Kid (Takeshi Matsuya)
 Logistics
 Quintician – Manifold (Eden Fesi)
 Teleport Team
 Blink (Clarice Ferguson)
 Lila Cheney
 Gateway
 Vanisher (Telford Porter)
 Voght (Amelia Voght)
 Medical/Energy Resources
 Executive Producer – Khora of the Burning Heart; Fabian Cortez (formerly)
 Diplomacy/Negotiation
 Amabassador Extraordinary – Frenzy (Joanna Cargill)
 Ambassador In Training – Armor (Hisako Ikichi)
 Galactic Ambassador – Paibok (from the Kree/Skrull Alliance)
 Security
 Security Director – Cable (Nathan Summers)
 Security Team
 Random (Marshall Stone III)
 Risque (Gloria Muñoz)
 Forearm (Michael McCain)
 Slab (Christopher Anderson)
Ruckus (Clement Wilson)
Thumbelina (Kristina Anderson)
 Observation/Analysis
 Psionic Analyst – Mentallo (Marvin Flumm)
 Analysis Team
 Peeper (Peter Quinn)

S.W.O.R.D. also formed The Six, a multiversal far-retrieval circuit, utilizing mutant technology. There are two stages require for a full retrieval:

 First Stage – Translocation: a circuit of five mid-to-long range teleporters which acts as the anchor for translocation. [Back-up: Nightcrawler and Magik]
 Second Stage – Retrieval: a circuit of six mutants with combining their protection and augmentation powers to reach different points in space.
 The Control – Wiz Kid: unify the first stage circuit of teleporters and adjust the mutant circuits in operation. [Back-up: Forge]
 The Power – Khora the Burning Heart; Fabian Cortez (formerly): provide the boost required for the circuit operation.
 The Shield – Armor: generate a protective exoskeleton that extends to the entire circuit. [Back-up: Skids]
 The Guide – Manifold: trans-locate the entirety of the second stage circuit while saving his energies for the retrieval.
 The Eye – Peeper: spot specific particles of their target. [Back-up: Doc]
 The Foundry – Risque: create a small field around their target condensing and containing it to help bring it back to Earth. [Back-up: Zorn]

Roster

Volume 1

Former Members:
Agent Deems – An autistic S.W.O.R.D. agent.
Beast
Benjamin Deeds – A mutant with transmorphing abilities.
Death's Head
Henry Peter Gyrich
Lockheed
Manifold Tyger – A tiger-like technician who secretly worked for the Providian Order.
Mindee – An alias of Irma Cuckoo of the Stepford Cuckoos.
Reilly Marshall – An ex-S.H.I.E.L.D. and S.W.O.R.D. agent who currently works for the U.N. Security Council.
Spider-Woman

Volume 2

Reception

Accolades 

 In 2019, CBR.com ranked S.W.O.R.D. 3rd in their "10 Most Powerful Secret Organizations In Marvel Comics" list.
 In 2022, CBR.com ranked S.W.O.R.D. 10th in their "The Avengers' 10 Best Allies In Marvel Comics" list.

In other media

Television
 S.W.O.R.D. appears in The Avengers: Earth's Mightiest Heroes animated series. Introduced in the episode "Welcome to the Kree Empire", this version of the organization operates out of Kang the Conqueror's captured spaceship, the Damocles. When Kree soldiers attack, Agents Carol Danvers and Abigail Brand mobilize to fend them off, with assistance from government agent Henry Peter Gyrich and the Kree's slave Sydren. Once S.W.O.R.D. retakes the Damocles, Sydren joins the organization. In the episode "Secret Invasion", a Skrull posing as Gyrich attempts to place a bomb on the Damocles, but Sydren detects it and evacuates the ship in time before it explodes.
 The creative team behind the live-action Marvel Cinematic Universe (MCU) TV series Agents of S.H.I.E.L.D. intended to incorporate S.W.O.R.D., but were refused permission by Marvel Studios. 
 S.W.O.R.D. appears in the live-action MCU miniseries WandaVision. This version of the organization's full name is the Sentient Weapon Observation and Response Division and was founded by Maria Rambeau. Following the events of the film Avengers: Infinity War, S.W.O.R.D. recovered Vision's body from Wakanda and under acting director Tyler Hayward, investigate Westview, New Jersey after Wanda Maximoff places it under a hex. Under Hayward's orders, they use a drone empowered by Maximoff to reactivate Vision. When she opens the hex to allow Westview's residents to escape, she inadvertently allows Hayward, the original Vision, and several S.W.O.R.D. agents in. However, Wanda's sons Billy and Tommy disarm them while a fictional Vision that Wanda created causes the original Vision to flee. Additionally, former S.W.O.R.D. agent and Maria's daughter, Monica Rambeau, and astrophysicist Dr. Darcy Lewis confront Hayward, who is later arrested by the FBI.
 S.W.O.R.D. member Abigail Brand will appear in the upcoming Disney+ series  Secret Invasion, set in the Marvel Cinematic Universe. The organisation itself may appear alongside Brand after first appearing in WandaVision.

Film
S.W.O.R.D. was originally intended to appear in the live-action MCU film Thor (2011), in a deleted post-credits scene wherein Erik Selvig tells Jane Foster and Darcy Lewis to "cross reference... with the S.W.O.R.D. database". Due to complications with 20th Century Fox, which owned the film rights to S.W.O.R.D. members Lockheed and Abigail Brand at the time however, the scene was cut.

Video games
 A variation of S.W.O.R.D. appears in Marvel Super Hero Squad. This version is depicted as an evil version of S.H.I.E.L.D. that the Silver Surfer encounters while in an alternate dimension.
 S.W.O.R.D. appears in Marvel Avengers Alliance Tactics.

Collected editions

Volume 1

Volume 2

See also
S.W.O.R.D. (Marvel Cinematic Universe)
List of government agencies in Marvel Comics

References

External links
S.W.O.R.D. at Marvel Database Project
S.W.O.R.D. at Comic Vine

S.W.O.R.D. at Runaways.mergingminds

X-Men supporting characters